Kochira Katsushika-ku Kameari Kōen-mae Hashutsujo (KochiKame) is a Japanese comedy manga series written and illustrated by Osamu Akimoto. Produced by Studio Gallop, it ran for eight years before ending on December 19, 2004.

Theme music
The series use twenty four pieces of theme music: seven opening and fourteen ending themes.

Episode list

1996

1997

1998

1999

2000

2001

2002

2003

2004

Specials

References

External links
 

episodes
Lists of anime episodes